Thiverval-Grignon is a commune in the Yvelines department in the Île-de-France region in north-central France.

Points of interest
Arboretum de Grignon
Jardin botanique de l'Institut National

See also
Communes of the Yvelines department

References

Communes of Yvelines